Eduardo Naranjo is a celebrated Spanish painter, born in 1944 in Monesterio, in the province of Badajoz, Extremadura, Spain. His work  is considered part of the 'Neo -Realism' trend of Spanish art.

Education
In 1957 he met his teacher Eduardo Acosta and entered the School of Arts and Crafts, where he remained until 1960. That same year he entered the School of Fine Arts of St. Elizabeth of Hungary. He moved to study at the School of Fine Arts of San Fernando in Madrid in 1961, where he studied painting .

Works
Among his stage designs are the plays The House of Bernarda Alba by Federico García Lorca and Make me a story of the night by Jorge Marquez. In 1986 started a book of engravings of Lorca's work Poet in New York, which he finished in 1991. These were exhibited for the first time at the Madrid Book Fair in 1987.

Awards
 1958 - Prize drawing "The Old School" of Arts and Crafts in Seville
 1961 - Award "Portraits" and prize drawing at the Royal Academy. Academy of Fine Arts of San Fernando
 1974 - "Premio Luis de Morales" in Badajoz
 1991 - "Today Extremadura" and Medal of Extremadura.
 1994 - National Print Award María de Salamanca, Spanish Contemporary Engraving Museum, Marbella
 1995 - It was awarded the Military Cross for his contribution to the Arts and the Army.

References

External links
 Official Website of Eduardo Naranjo
 Pictures of Eduardo Naranjo
 Photos of his work
 Photos of his work
 Works E.Naranjo
 Graphic work of Eduardo Naranjo

1944 births
20th-century Spanish painters
20th-century Spanish male artists
Spanish male painters
21st-century Spanish painters
People from Tentudía
Living people
Spanish contemporary artists
21st-century Spanish male artists